Route 216 is a numbered state highway running  in Rhode Island. Its southern terminus is at U.S. Route 1 (US 1) in Charlestown, and its northern terminus is at the Connecticut border where it continues as Connecticut Route 216.

Route description

Route 216 starts at an intersection with U.S. Route 1 (US 1) on the northern side of Quonochontaug Pond near Charlestown. From this intersection, Route 216 runs northward along Ross Hill Road through wooded terrain past the Shelter Harbor Golf Club. The highway crosses the Perry Healy Brook before Route 216 enters Westerly and follows Church Street northerly and northwesterly. In Bradford, Route 216 meets Route 91 (Bradford Road) and turns northward to run concurrently with Route 91 along and over the Pawcatuck River. On the north side of the river, the highway follows Alton–Bradford Road to the intersection with Ashaway Road. There, Route 216 turns westward and separates from Route 91 in Hopkinton. The highway runs through residential neighborhoods adjacent to the river until the intersection with Chase Hill Road where Route 216 turns northwesterly again.

In the community of Ashaway, Route 216 jogs southwesterly along Main Street for a block before turning back northwesterly along High Street. The highway meanders through the community and crosses the Ashaway River on High Street. At the Connecticut state line, the highway ends and becomes Connecticut Route 216.

Major intersections

References

External links

2019 Highway Map, Rhode Island

216
Transportation in Washington County, Rhode Island